Carlo Pignatiello (born 16 January 2000) is a Scottish professional footballer who plays for Scottish Championship club Greenock Morton.

Career
Pignatiello began his career at youth level with Rangers and later played for St Mirren before joining Livingston. He had loan spells with BSC Glasgow in the Lowland League and Stranraer in Scottish League One.

He made his professional debut as a late substitute in a Scottish Premiership 3–2 defeat against Celtic in September 2020. Pignatiello was loaned to Arbroath in February 2021. He then joined Dumbarton on a season long loan in July 2021. He scored his first goal for the Sons in a 3–1 victory against Sauchie Juniors in November 2021 and was named the club's Young Player of the Year and Players' Player of the Year at the end of the season.

On 23 May 2022, it was announced, via the club's website, that he would join Greenock Morton on a pre-contract deal. He made his first appearance for the club in a pre-season friendly draw against Annan Athletic at Raydale Park.

References

External links
 

2000 births
Living people
Scottish footballers
Association football midfielders
Rangers F.C. players
St Mirren F.C. players
Livingston F.C. players
Broomhill F.C. (Scotland) players
Stranraer F.C. players
Scottish Professional Football League players
Lowland Football League players
Arbroath F.C. players
Dumbarton F.C. players
Greenock Morton F.C. players
Footballers from Glasgow